Rachid Rokki (born 8 November 1974) is a former Moroccan footballer.

Career 
During his career he played for clubs such as Spanish side Sevilla and Albacete Balompié. His position was striker. During the Season 1997-1998, Rokki was the top scorer of his team SCCM de Mohammedia. His performances drew attention on a national scale, which earned him a place in the national squad.

International 
He was in the Moroccan squad for the 98 World Cup.

External links 

Living people
1974 births
Moroccan footballers
Footballers from Casablanca
Moroccan expatriate footballers
Morocco international footballers
1998 FIFA World Cup players
2002 African Cup of Nations players
La Liga players
Albacete Balompié players
Sevilla FC players
Expatriate footballers in Spain
Moroccan expatriate sportspeople in Spain
Moroccan expatriate sportspeople in Qatar
Al-Khor SC players
Umm Salal SC players
Fath Union Sport players
Qatar Stars League players
Expatriate footballers in Qatar
Botola players
Association football forwards
SCC Mohammédia players